Flaming Bullets is a 1945 American Western film written and directed by Harry L. Fraser. The film, the final of PRC's Texas Rangers film series, stars Tex Ritter, Dave O'Brien, Guy Wilkerson, Patricia Knox, Charles King as comedy relief and I. Stanford Jolley. The film was released on October 15, 1945, by Producers Releasing Corporation.

Plot

Cast          
Tex Ritter as Tex Haines
Dave O'Brien as Dave Wyatt / Steve Carson
Guy Wilkerson as Panhandle Perkins
Patricia Knox as Belle
Charles King as Porky Smith 
I. Stanford Jolley as Sid Tolliver
Bob Duncan as Eddie
Bud Osborne as Town Marshal

See also
The Texas Rangers series:
 The Rangers Take Over (1942)
 Bad Men of Thunder Gap (1943)
 West of Texas (1943)
 Border Buckaroos (1943)
 Fighting Valley (1943)
 Trail of Terror (1943)
 The Return of the Rangers (1943)
 Boss of Rawhide (1943)
 Outlaw Roundup (1944)
 Guns of the Law (1944)
 The Pinto Bandit (1944)
 Spook Town (1944)
 Brand of the Devil (1944)
 Gunsmoke Mesa (1944)
 Gangsters of the Frontier (1944)
 Dead or Alive (1944)
 The Whispering Skull (1944)
 Marked for Murder (1945)
 Enemy of the Law (1945)
 Three in the Saddle (1945)
 Frontier Fugitives (1945)
 Flaming Bullets (1945)

References

External links
 

1945 films
1940s English-language films
American Western (genre) films
1945 Western (genre) films
Producers Releasing Corporation films
Films directed by Harry L. Fraser
Films with screenplays by Harry L. Fraser
1940s American films